The mixed team table tennis event was a part of the table tennis program at the 2010 Summer Youth Olympics and took place at the Singapore Indoor Stadium. The tournament started on August 24 with the final on August 26.

32 teams took part in the mixed team event.  Teams contained a boy and a girl and were created in an attempt to link athletes by geographic origin, 17 teams contained athletes from the same country, 11 teams contained athletes from the same continent and 4 intercontinental teams were created.

Teams were placed into eight groups where they would play a round robin.  In each match the girls of each team will play against each other followed by the boys of each team and ending with a doubles match.  The top two from each group proceeded to the next round where a single elimination tournament with a bronze medal final was played.  Two consolation rounds were played for teams not advancing to the single elimination tournament.

Medalists

Teams

Group stage

Round 1

Group A

Group B

Group C

Group D

Group E

Group F

Group G

Group H

Consolation Rounds

Consolation Round 1

Consolation Round 2

Knockout stage

References
 Seeding
 Results

Table tennis at the 2010 Summer Youth Olympics